Salim Bey Karam, born on May 21, 1946, in Zgharta, Lebanon was a Minister of State in the Lebanese government. He is also a Member of Parliament for the Maronite Catholic seat of Zgharta-Zawyie, in North Lebanon.

Early life and education
Salim Bey Karam was born in Zgharta on May 21, 1946. He is the fourth son of  politician and former MP Youssef Salim Karam. His mother was Mariette Tarabay. His father was a Member of Parliament during (1943-1947), (1947-1953), (1960-1964). His grandfather, Salim Bey Mikhael Bey Karam, was District Governor of Ehden (1898-1900).

He is a direct descendant of a brother of the famous national Lebanese hero Youssef Bey Karam.

Karam was educated at De La Salle School in Tripoli and International College of Beirut. He went to American University of Beirut, graduating with a Business Degree. He has had a career in commerce and agriculture.

Political career

Salim Karam has been the leader of the Karam Family League since 1973 after the step down of his older brother Assaad Bey (after 1972 Parliamentary Elections). He was a member of the High Political Leadership Council of Zgharta during 1975-76 Lebanese Civil War.

He was staunchly opposed to the Syrian occupation of Lebanon in the 1990s; however, today with the withdrawal of Syrian Armies from Lebanon he supports equal bi-lateral relations with Syria with the strict condition Syria does not interfere in Lebanese politics.

Karam was a candidate in the General Elections of 1996, 2000 and 2005 and boycotted the 1992 elections in line with the wishes of General Michel Aoun

During the Lebanese Parliamentary Elections of 7 June 2009, Salim Bey Karam was elected for the 1st time as a Member of Parliament for the Maronite seat of Zgharta-Zawyieh. He won the seat along with his two running partners Suleiman Frangieh, Jr and Estephan El Douaihy.

He was appointed minister of state in June 2011. He is part of the March 8 coalition and the Change and Reform bloc in Najib Mikati's cabinet.

Personal life
Karam married in 1975 Marina Nabih Chammas and they have two daughters, Rita and Christina.

See also
Youssef Bey Karam
Youssef Salim Karam
Ehden
Zgharta

External links
Salim Bey Karam on Ehden Family Tree Website

References

Living people
Lebanese Maronites
People from Zgharta
Members of the Parliament of Lebanon
1946 births
Salim Bey
Marada Movement politicians